Thondamuthur is a legislative assembly in Coimbatore district in Tamil Nadu, which includes the town, Thondamuthur. Its State Assembly Constituency number is 119. Thondamuthur assembly constituency is part of Coimbatore Lok Sabha constituency. It was a part of Nilgiris Lok Sabha constituency till 2007. Election was not held in the year 1957. It is one of the 234 State Legislative Assembly Constituencies in Tamil Nadu, in India.

Madras State

Tamil Nadu

Election results

2021

2016

2011

2009 By-election

2006

2001

1996

1991

1989

1984

1980

1977

1971

1967

1962

1952

Bifurcation and Delimitation 
The existing Thondamuthur Assembly Constituency was bifurcated in 2007 to create a new constituency - Kavundampalayam. Instead some parts of the Perur constituency were added to Thondamuthur after the removal of Perur constituency.

References

External links 
 

Assembly constituencies of Tamil Nadu
Coimbatore district